Camptoloma mirabilis is a moth of the subfamily Arctiinae first described by Roepke in 1943. It is found on Java, Peninsular Malaysia and Borneo. The species is found in montane habitats.

Adults have white wings with a series of dark grey stripes and spots.

Subspecies
Camptoloma mirabilis mirabilis
Camptoloma mirabilis nigrior Holloway, 1976

References

Arctiinae